Hannah Cowley may refer to:
Hannah Cowley (writer) (1743–1809), English playwright and poet
Hannah Cowley (actress) (born 1981), British actress and director